White City: A Novel is the fourth solo studio album by English rock musician Pete Townshend, released on 11 November 1985 by Atco Records. The album was produced by Chris Thomas (who had also produced Townshend's previous two albums, Empty Glass and All the Best Cowboys Have Chinese Eyes) and it was recorded by Bill Price at three separate recording studios in London, England: both of the Eel Pie studios, and A.I.R.

The album peaked at No. 70 on the UK Albums Chart, and at No. 26 on the US Billboard 200. The album also reached the Top 20 in five other countries, Australia, Germany, New Zealand, Sweden and Switzerland.

Concept 

A loose concept album, its title refers to a story (called a "novel" in the album title) that accompanies the album, which takes place in a low-income housing estate in the West London district of White City, near where Townshend had grown up. The story tells of cultural conflict, racial tension and youthful hopes and dreams in the 1960s – a world of "prostituted children", "roads leading to darkness, leading home" and despairing residents living in "cells" with views of "dustbins and a Ford Cortina". The song "White City Fighting", which features Pink Floyd's David Gilmour on guitar, tells listeners that the White City was "a black, violent place" where "battles were won, and battles were blown, at the height of the White City fighting".

The album opens with crashing guitar chords (also played by Gilmour)
that capture a feeling of urban chaos, leading into "Give Blood", a song with Townshend's moral lyrics demanding listeners to "give blood, but you may find that blood is not enough".

Film
The disc also mentions a film based on the album, directed and "adapted for longform video" by Richard Lowenstein. The 60-minute video, entitled White City: The Music Movie, was released by Vestron Music Video in 1985 and stars Pete Townshend, Andrew Wilde and Frances Barber. The videotape also features exclusive footage of Townshend discussing the album and film, and the premiere performance of "Night School". That song, in a different form, would be included on Hip-O's 2006 reissue as a bonus track.

Album contents
The track "White City Fighting" originated as a composition written by David Gilmour for his 1984 solo album About Face. He asked Townshend to supply lyrics, but felt that he couldn't relate to them, so Townshend used the song instead with Gilmour playing guitar. Gilmour sent the same tune to Roy Harper, whose lyrics had the same effect as Townshend's on Gilmour. Harper used the result, "Hope", which has a markedly slower tempo, on his 1985 album Whatever Happened to Jugula? with Harper's son Nick on guitar.

Cash Box said that "Secondhand Love" "continues Townshend’s penchant for brilliant songwriting and tough, hard-hitting performance."  Billboard said it's "delivered with [Townshend's] customary intensity."

Track listing

Non-album tracks
"Face the Face" (Vocal long version) – 6:08 (Available on 12" US Atco and European Singles)
"Hiding Out" (Instrumental version) – 3:00 (Available on 12" Atco Germany single of "Hiding Out")
"Night School" – 3:03 (Video version)
"Face the Face" (Single edit) – 4:23 (Available on 7" US single)
"Face the Face" (Edit version) – 3:59 (Available on 12" US promo single)

Personnel
Credits are adapted from the White City: A Novel liner notes.

Musicians
Pete Townshend – vocals; guitar
John "Rabbit" Bundrick – keyboards
Tony Butler, Phil Chen, Chucho Merchan, Pino Palladino, & Steve Barnacle – bass guitars
Mark Brzezicki, Simon Phillips – drums
Clem Burke – drums 
David Gilmour – guitar 
Peter Hope-Evans – harmonica
Kick Horns: Simon Clarke, Roddy Lorimer, Tim Sanders, Peter Thoms
Ewan Stewart – voice (spoken word)
Emma Townshend, Jackie Challenor, Mae McKenna, & Lorenza Johnson – backing vocals
Justine Frischmann – backing vocals on "Night School"

Technical

Chris Thomas – producer
Bill Price – recording
Chris Ludwinski, Dave Edwards, & Jules Bowen – assistant engineers

Artwork
Richard Evans – art direction; cover design; inner sleeve photography
Alex Henderson – front cover photography
Malcolm Heywood – inner sleeve photography

Charts

Certifications

References

External links

1985 albums
Pete Townshend albums
Rock operas
Albums produced by Chris Thomas (record producer)
Atco Records albums
White City, London